Alfalfa House Community Food Cooperative Ltd is a not-for-profit food cooperative based in Enmore, Sydney, Australia. It is a registered cooperative. Alfalfa House began in the front room of a terraced house in Erskineville in 1981.

According to its introductory material for new members, the main aim of the cooperative is to provide minimally-packaged and minimally-processed organic food and low-impact common household products, processed in ways that minimise harm to both people and the environment.

Policy 
Alfalfa House is managed by a board of directors, known as the Members' Council, elected at the cooperative's Annual General Meeting. The council oversees the financial management and general ongoing policy-making of the co-op. According to its Rules of Incorporation, any financial surpluses are to be re-invested in the co-op to improve services to the membership.

Objectives 
According to its Rules of Incorporation, Alfalfa House aims to
  provide a retail source of wholefoods so that members may have some control over the sources of their food supply 
  provide information on and promote the use of: low-cost, ethically-produced and packaged wholefoods; cruelty-free foods; vegetarian foods; vegan foods; organic foods; and genetically modified-free foods 
  run an ethical, not-for-profit business 
  minimise resource wastage and, hence, encourage reuse and recycling 
  support other cooperatives whose objectives are similar or related to the objectives of the cooperative 
  stimulate community development, foster community spirit and promote sustainable living

See also
 List of food cooperatives

References

Food cooperatives
Organizations established in 1988
Cooperatives in Australia